= Frank S. Platts =

American politician

Frank Sears Platts (July 27, 1888 - July 7, 1972) was an American Republican Party politician who served seven terms in the New Jersey General Assembly.

== Early life ==
Platts was born July 27, 1888, in Newark, New Jersey, the son of Frank James Platts (1857-1932) and Mary Josephine "Josie" Sears (1862-1895). He graduated New York University and New Jersey Law School. He was a Certified Public Accountant. Platts was a World War I veteran and served as Assistant Division Adjutant of the Port of Hoboken.

== Political career ==
He was elected to the New Jersey State Assembly in 1932 and re-elected in 1933. He was Chairman of the Assembly Appropriations Committee in 1933. He was again elected Assemblyman in 1937, and was re-elected in 1938, 1939, and 1940.

Platts was elected Essex County Freeholder in 1950.

== Family ==
He married Bertha "Bertie" Agnes Eschenfelder (1892-1972), a school teacher, in 1918. They had two children.
